The men's high jump event at the 1967 Pan American Games was held in Winnipeg on 30 July.

Results

References

Athletics at the 1967 Pan American Games
1967